Brănești is a commune in Dâmbovița County, Muntenia, Romania. It is composed of two villages, Brănești and Priboiu.

Natives
 Vlad Voiculescu

References

Communes in Dâmbovița County
Localities in Muntenia